() is a French term meaning "end of century,” a phrase which typically encompasses both the meaning of the similar English idiom "turn of the century" and also makes reference to the closing of one era and onset of another. Without context, the term is typically used to refer to the end of the 19th century. This period was widely thought to be a period of social degeneracy, but at the same time a period of hope for a new beginning. The "spirit" of  often refers to the cultural hallmarks that were recognized as prominent in the 1880s and 1890s, including ennui, cynicism, pessimism, and "a widespread belief that civilization leads to decadence.”

The term  is commonly applied to French art and artists, as the traits of the culture first appeared there, but the movement affected many European countries. The term becomes applicable to the sentiments and traits associated with the culture, as opposed to focusing solely on the movement's initial recognition in France. The ideas and concerns developed by  artists provided the impetus for movements such as symbolism and modernism.

Professor of Historical Geography at the University of Nottingham, Michael Heffernan, and  Mackubin Thomas Owens wrote about the origins of geopolitics:

The "new world of the Twentieth century would need to be understood in its entirety, as an integrated global whole". Technology and global communication made the world "smaller" and turned it into a single system; the time was characterized by pan-ideas and a utopian "one-worldism," proceeding further than pan-ideas.

The major political theme of the era was that of revolt against materialism, rationalism, positivism, bourgeois society, and liberal democracy. The  generation supported emotionalism, irrationalism, subjectivism, and vitalism, while the mindset of the age saw civilization as being in a crisis that required a massive and total solution.

syndrome

Michael Heffernan in his article  [End of the century, end of the world?] (2000) finds in the Christian world what he calls "the syndrome of ". In 2000, this took the form of the Year 2000 problem.  are accompanied by future expectations:

Degeneration theory

B. A. Morel's degeneration theory holds that although societies can progress, they can also remain static or even regress if influenced by a flawed environment, such as national conditions or outside cultural influences. This degeneration can be passed from generation to generation, resulting in imbecility and senility due to hereditary influence. Max Nordau's Degeneration holds that the two dominant traits of those degenerated in a society involve ego mania and mysticism. The former term was understood to mean a pathological degree of self-absorption and unreasonable attention to one's own sentiments and activities, as can be seen in the extremely descriptive nature of minute details; the latter referred to the impaired ability to translate primary perceptions into fully developed ideas, largely noted in symbolist works. Nordau's treatment of these traits as degenerative qualities lends to the perception of a world falling into decay through fin de siècle corruptions of thought, and influencing the pessimism growing in Europe's philosophical consciousness. As  citizens, attitudes tended toward science in an attempt to decipher the world in which they lived. The focus on psycho-physiology, now psychology, was a large part of  society in that it studied a topic that could not be depicted through Romanticism, but relied on traits exhibited to suggest how the mind works, as does symbolism.
The concept of genius returned to popular consciousness around this period through Max Nordau's work with degeneration, prompting study of artists supposedly affected by social degeneration and what separates imbecility from genius. The first, which means delusions of grandeur, begins with a disproportionate sense of importance in one's own activities and results in a sense of alienation, as Nordau describes in Baudelaire, as well as the second characteristic of madness of doubt, which involves intense indecision and extreme preoccupation with minute detail. The difference between degenerate genius and degenerate madman become the extensive knowledge held by the genius in a few areas paired with a belief in one's own superiority as a result.

Pessimism

England's ideological space was affected by the philosophical waves of pessimism sweeping Europe, starting with philosopher Arthur Schopenhauer's work from before 1860 and gradually influencing artists internationally. R. H. Goodale identified 235 essays by British and American authors concerning pessimism, ranging from 1871 to 1900, showing the prominence of pessimism in conjunction with English ideology. Further, Oscar Wilde's references to pessimism in his works demonstrate the relevance of the ideology on the English. In An Ideal Husband, Wilde's protagonist asks another character whether "at heart, [she is] an optimist or a pessimist? Those seem to be the only two fashionable religions left to us nowadays." Wilde's reflection on personal philosophy as more culturally significant than religion lends credence to degeneration theory, as applied to Baudelaire's influence on other nations. However, the optimistic Romanticism popular earlier in the century would also have affected the shifting ideological landscape. The newly fashionable pessimism appears again in Wilde's The Importance of Being Earnest, written that same year:

Lane is philosophically current as of 1895, reining in his master's optimism about the weather by reminding Algernon of how the world typically operates. His pessimism gives satisfaction to Algernon; the perfect servant of a gentleman is one who is philosophically aware. Charles Baudelaire's work demonstrates some of the pessimism expected of the time, and his work with modernity exemplified the decadence and decay with which turn-of-the-century French art is associated, while his work with symbolism promoted the mysticism Nordau associated with  artists. Baudelaire's pioneering translations of Edgar Allan Poe's verse supports the aesthetic role of translation in  culture, while his own works influenced French and English artists through the use of modernity and symbolism. Baudelaire, Rimbaud, and their contemporaries became known as French decadents, a group that influenced its English counterpart, the aesthetes like Oscar Wilde. Both groups believed the purpose of art was to evoke an emotional response and demonstrate the beauty inherent in the unnatural as opposed to trying to teach its audience an infallible sense of morality.

Literary conventions
In the Victorian , the themes of degeneration and anxiety are expressed not only through the physical landscape which provided a backdrop for Gothic Literature, but also through the human body itself. Works such as Robert Louis Stevenson's The Strange Case of Dr Jekyll and Mr Hyde (1886), Oscar Wilde's The Picture of Dorian Gray (1891), Arthur Machen's The Great God Pan (1894), H. G. Wells' The Time Machine (1895), and Bram Stoker's Dracula (1897) all explore themes of change, development, evolution, mutation, corruption and decay in relation to the human body and mind. These literary conventions were a direct reflection of many evolutionary, scientific, social and medical theories and advancements that emerged toward the end of the 19th century.

Artistic conventions

The works of the Decadents and the Aesthetes contain the hallmarks typical of  art. Holbrook Jackson's The Eighteen Nineties describes the characteristics of English decadence, which are: perversity, artificiality, egoism, and curiosity. The first trait is the concern for the perverse, unclean, and unnatural. Romanticism encouraged audiences to view physical traits as indicative of one's inner self, whereas the  artists accepted beauty as the basis of life, and so valued that which was not conventionally beautiful.

This belief in beauty in the abject leads to the obsession with artifice and symbolism, as artists rejected ineffable ideas of beauty in favour of the abstract. Through symbolism, aesthetes could evoke sentiments and ideas in their audience without relying on an infallible general understanding of the world.

The third trait of the culture is egoism, a term similar to that of "egomania", meaning disproportionate attention placed on one's own endeavours. This can result in a type of alienation and anguish, as in Baudelaire's case, and demonstrates how aesthetic artists chose cityscapes over country as a result of their aversion to the natural.

Finally, curiosity is identifiable through diabolism and the exploration of the evil or immoral, focusing on the morbid and macabre, but without imposing any moral lessons on the audience.

See also

 Belle Époque
 Gay Nineties
 Futurism
 Lost generation
 Symbolism (arts)
 Decadent movement
 Reactionary politics

References

Further reading
Schwartz, Hillel. Century's End: A Cultural History of the Fin de Siècle—From the 990s Through the 1990s. New York: Doubleday, 1990.

External links
 Fin de Siècle at The British Library

 
French words and phrases
Literary modernism
19th century in France
Cultural history of Europe